, Canadian leisure airline Air Transat serves the following destinations:

List

References

Lists of airline destinations
Air Transat